The brown-snouted blind snake (Anilios wiedii), also known commonly as Wied's blind snake, is a species of snake in the family Typhlopidae. The species is endemic to Australia.

Etymology
The specific name, wiedii, is in honor of German naturalist Prince Maximilian of Wied-Neuwied.

Geographic range
A. wiedii is found in the Australian states of New South Wales and Queensland.

Habitat
The preferred habitats of A. wiedii are forests and savannas.

Description
It is brownish dorsally, and yellowish ventrally. The snout is very prominent, rounded, with the nostrils inferior. There are 20 rows of scales around the body. The body is slender, about 50 times as long as broad.

Reproduction
A. wiedii is oviparous.

References

Further reading
Boulenger GA (1893). Catalogue of the Snakes in the British Museum (Natural History). Volume I., Containing the Families Typhlopidæ ... London: Trustees of the British Museum (Natural History). (Taylor and Francis, printers). xiii + 448 pp. + Plates I-XXVIII. (Typhlops wiedii, p. 36).
Cogger H (2014). Reptiles and Amphibians of Australia, Seventh Edition. Collingwood, Victoria, Australia: CSIRO Publishing xxx + 1,033 pp. . (Ramphotyphlops wiedii, p. 812).
Hedges SB, Marion AB, Lipp KM, Marin J, Vidal N (2014). "A taxonomic framework for typhlopid snakes from the Caribbean and other regions (Reptilia, Squamata)". Caribbean Herpetology (49): 1-61. (Anilios wiedii, new combination).
Peters W (1867). "Herpetologische Notizen ". Monatsberichte der Königlichen Preussischen Akademie der Wissenschaften zu Berlin 1867: 13–37. (Typhlops wiedii, new species, pp. 24–25). (in German).
Wallach V (2006). "The Nomenclatural Status of Australian Ramphotyphlops (Serpentes: Typhlopidae)". Bulletin of the Maryland Herpetological Society 42 (1): 8-24. (Austrotyphlops wiedii, new combination, p. 13).
Wilson S, Swan G (2013). A Complete Guide to Reptiles and Amphibians of Australia, Fourth Edition. Sydney: New Holland Publishers. 522 pp. .

Anilios
Reptiles described in 1867
Taxa named by Wilhelm Peters
Snakes of Australia